Stanko Mladenovski (born 9 November 1937) is a former Speaker of the People's Assembly of Socialist Republic of Macedonia.

References

1937 births
People from Kumanovo
Macedonian politicians
Macedonian communists
Living people